The Arab Athletics Championships is an event organized by the Arab Athletic Association. It traditionally occurred every two years. It was not held in 1985 due to the schedule clash with the Pan Arab Games. However, due to the erratic scheduling of the games, both the athletics championships and games athletics competition have been held in the same year on several occasions since 1997. Typically, the championships is rescheduled to earlier in the year as a result. Women's events have been present on the programme since the second edition in 1979. The programme is usually combined although the women competed separately from the men for the tenth edition of the tournament, which was split between 1997 and 1998.

Editions

Statistics

Wins by country

All-time medal table 1977–2021

Championships records

Men

Women

See also
Athletics at the Pan Arab Games
Arab Junior Athletics Championships
International Athletics Championships and Games

References

Pan Arab Championships. GBR Athletics. Retrieved on 2013-10-05.

External links 
Arab Athletics website

 
Athletics competitions in Asia
Athletics competitions in Africa
Athletics
Recurring sporting events established in 1977
Biennial athletics competitions